The Tohoku Mathematical Journal is a mathematical research journal published by Tohoku University in Japan. It was founded in August 1911 by Tsuruichi Hayashi.

History
Due to World War II the publication of the journal stopped in 1943 with volume 49. Publication was resumed in 1949 with the volume numbering starting again at 1. In order to distinguish between the identical numbered volumes, volumes in the first publishing period are referred to as the first series whereas the later volumes are called second series. 

Before volume 51 of the second series the journal was called Tôhoku Mathematical Journal, with a circumflex over the second letter of Tohoku.

Selected papers
. The first publication of the Sprague–Grundy theorem, the basis for much of combinatorial game theory, later independently rediscovered by P. M. Grundy. 
. This paper describes Weiszfeld's algorithm for finding the geometric median.
. This paper, often referred to as "The Tohoku paper" or simply "Tohoku", introduced the axioms of abelian categories.
. Part II, 13: 281–294, 1961, . The introduction of Sasakian manifolds.

References

Further reading

External links 
 Official website of the journal

Mathematics journals
Publications established in 1911
1911 establishments in Japan
Tohoku University
Academic journals associated with universities and colleges